Who Is Killing the Great Chefs of Europe? (released in the UK as Too Many Chefs) is a 1978 black comedy mystery film directed by Ted Kotcheff and starring George Segal, Jacqueline Bisset and Robert Morley. It is based on the 1976 novel Someone Is Killing the Great Chefs of Europe by Nan and Ivan Lyons.

Plot
Natasha "Nat" O'Brien is a celebrated pastry chef invited to London to assist in preparing a state dinner for the queen, organized by culinary critic Maximillian "Max" Vandeveer. Natasha's ex-husband, Robert "Robby" Ross, is a fast-food entrepreneur ("the Taco King") serving the "everyman" consumer while she caters to the affluent. Max is the "calamitously fat" grand gourmand publisher of a gourmet magazine Epicurious and is patron of several famous European chefs, each renowned for a signature dish.

When Natasha arrives, Max is gloating over his latest issue, featuring "the world's most fabulous meal," which highlights the culinary masterpieces of his favorite chefs. However, Max's health is failing from an addiction to those chefs' specialties. After completing the meal at Buckingham Palace, Natasha has a one-night fling with chef Louis Kohner whose specialty is baked pigeon in crust. The next morning, Natasha finds Louis dead in a 450° oven. After being questioned by Inspector Blodgett, Natasha and Robby depart for Venice, where Natasha is wooed by another chef, Fausto Zoppi, whose specialty is a lobster dish. However, when turning up for their date at his kitchen, Natasha finds Zoppi dead in a tank of lobsters.

After more questioning, this time by Venice police, Natasha receives a call from Robby to come to Paris to help prevent one member of a group of French chefs from being murdered. When they arrive, they hold a meeting discussing how Louis and Zoppi were killed and what to do next. Later that night, after a phone call from Max (who learns from his assistant Beecham that Natasha is no longer in Venice, but in Paris staying with Robby), Natasha puts together what Louis and Zoppi had in common – both made a dish featured in the aforementioned magazine article. It is now known that the next to be killed will be Jean-Claude Moulineau, whose specialty is pressed duck. The disturbing fact is that the killings are following the order of a meal, so Natasha will be the last to be killed, her specialty being a dessert known as "Le' Bombe Richelieu." Robby tries to calm Natasha by suspecting Max as the killer, with the motive that he was the one who selected Natasha, Louis, Fausto and Jean-Claude to be in the magazine, but Natasha believes the killer is really Auguste Grandvilliers, with the motive that he was left off the list; however, when they attempt to call Moulineau to warn him, they receive a phone call from Grandvilliers that someone is at his restaurant. When they arrive, Robby and Natasha find Grandvilliers on a meat hook in the freezer, still alive.

Robby and Natasha begin falling in love again. After being questioned by police, Natasha and Robby learn from Inspector Doyle that Moulineau was killed after being pushed headfirst into a duck-press. Back in London, Natasha is set to be a guest on A Moveable Feast. Robby initially decides to stay with her to keep her safe. However, Robby and Natasha learn from Max that Blodgett called Beecham to inform her that Grandvilliers confessed to the murders, so Robby can head to Brussels. As he is heading to the airport, he's watching Natasha on TV and realizes that the cake that Natasha is set to light – the cake Robby poked three holes into like a bowling ball – was switched and now has a bomb inside it. He calls Blodgett to confront him about Grandvilliers' confession, only to learn no one confessed. That's when Robby once again suspects Max is the killer. He arrives at the TV studio and rescues her just in time, as 30–45 seconds later, the cake explodes on-air. In the end, the killer turns out to be not Max, as Robby suspected, but Beecham, Max's dedicated assistant whose motive was admiration and love for Max. She wanted to kill the chefs to protect Max from the food he couldn't resist that was slowly killing him. In the final scene, Robby and Natasha get remarried.

Cast

 George Segal as Robert Ross 
 Jacqueline Bisset as Natasha O'Brien 
 Robert Morley as Maximillian Vandeveer 
 Jean-Pierre Cassel as Louis Kohner 
 Philippe Noiret as Jean-Claude Moulineau 
 Jean Rochefort as Auguste Grandvilliers 
 Gigi Proietti as Ravello (as Luigi Proietti) 
 Stefano Satta Flores as Fausto Zoppi 
 Madge Ryan as Beecham 
 Frank Windsor as Blodgett 
 Peter Sallis as St. Claire 
 Tim Barlow as Inspector Doyle 
 John Le Mesurier as Dr. Deere 
 Joss Ackland as Cantrell
 Jean Gaven as Salpetre 
 Daniel Emilfork as Saint-Juste 
 Jacques Marin as Massenet 
 Jacques Balutin as Chappemain 
 Jean Parédès as Brissac 
 Michael Chow as Soong 
 Anita Graham as Blonde 
 Nicholas Ball as Skeffington 
 David Cook as Bussingbill 
 Nigel Havers as Counterman
 Caroline Langrishe as Loretta

Release
The film was distributed by Warner Bros. and produced by Lorimar. Warner Communications acquired Lorimar in 1989 and now owns the rights to the film.

Reception
The film received critical acclaim and currently has a fresh 73% rating on Rotten Tomatoes from 11 reviews. Roger Ebert called it "a light, silly entertainment with class."

Awards
Morley won Best Supporting Actor at the 1978 Los Angeles Film Critics Association Awards (1978) and at the National Society of Film Critics Awards (1979). He was also nominated for a Golden Globe for Best Motion Picture Actor in a Supporting Role along with Bisset for Best Motion Picture Actress (1979).

References

External links
 
 
 

1978 films
1970s black comedy films
American black comedy films
1970s comedy mystery films
Cooking films
1970s English-language films
English-language German films
Films scored by Henry Mancini
Films directed by Ted Kotcheff
Films set in London
Films set in Paris
Films set in Venice
American serial killer films
West German films
1970s serial killer films
American comedy mystery films
1978 comedy films
1970s American films
Films about chefs